Daniel Šarić (born 4 August 1972 in Rijeka) is a Croatian retired footballer who played as a right wingback. His name is sometimes spelled as Danijel Šarić.

Club career
Born in Rijeka, Šarić started his professional career at local club NK Rijeka back in 1989. He went on to move to Spanish club Sporting de Gijón in 1993 and subsequently returned to Croatia by signing with Dinamo Zagreb in 1995. After five years with Dinamo, he went on to move abroad once again by signing with Greek club Panathinaikos for the 2000–01 season. He stayed at Panathinaikos until the summer of 2003 and then returned to his home town by signing a four-year contract with NK Rijeka. He retired in July 2007 after the contract expired.

International career
Šarić was also an almost regular member of the Croatian national team between 1997 and 2002. He made his debut for Croatia in an October 1997 World Cup qualification match away against Slovenia and earned a total of 30 caps, scoring no goals. His only major tournament was the 2002 FIFA World Cup, where he appeared in all of the Croatian team's three group matches and was a starting player in two of them. His final international was a September 2002 European Championship qualification match against Estonia.

Statistics

Club

International

Honours
Rijeka
Croatian Cup (2): 2005, 2006

Dinamo Zagreb
Prva HNL (5): 1995–96, 1996–97, 1997–98, 1998–99, 1999–00
Croatian Cup (3): 1996, 1997, 1998

Individual
NK Rijeka all time XI

References

External links
 

1972 births
Living people
Footballers from Rijeka
Association football fullbacks
Yugoslav footballers
Croatian footballers
Croatia under-21 international footballers
Croatia international footballers
2002 FIFA World Cup players
HNK Rijeka players
Sporting de Gijón players
GNK Dinamo Zagreb players
Panathinaikos F.C. players
Yugoslav First League players
Croatian Football League players
La Liga players
Super League Greece players
Croatian expatriate footballers
Expatriate footballers in Spain
Croatian expatriate sportspeople in Spain
Expatriate footballers in Greece
Croatian expatriate sportspeople in Greece
HNK Rijeka non-playing staff